Kim Dong-Gwon is a South Korean football player for Gimhae FC.

Club statistics

External links

 

1992 births
Living people
Association football defenders
South Korean footballers
South Korean expatriate footballers
K League 1 players
K League 2 players
Korea National League players
J2 League players
Pohang Steelers players
FC Gifu players
FC Osaka players
Chungju Hummel FC players
Ulsan Hyundai Mipo Dockyard FC players
Expatriate footballers in Japan
South Korean expatriate sportspeople in Japan